Gracelock (also Havelock) is an unincorporated community in Havelock Township, Chippewa County, Minnesota, United States.

It is not governed by a local municipal corporation.

Notes

Unincorporated communities in Chippewa County, Minnesota
Unincorporated communities in Minnesota